Algot Larsson (November 29, 1889 – November 12, 1967) was a Swedish track and field athlete who competed in the 1912 Summer Olympics. In 1912 he finished 21st in the javelin throw competition.

References

External links
Sports Reference
profile

1889 births
1967 deaths
Swedish male javelin throwers
Olympic athletes of Sweden
Athletes (track and field) at the 1912 Summer Olympics